R (E) v Governing Body of JFS [2009] UKSC 15 is a United Kingdom discrimination case, concerning the Jewish Free School's policy of denying entry to people whom they defined as belonging to a different religion.

The United Kingdom Supreme Court held by a majority of five to four that the school had discriminated against pupils, including the claimant, "E", on the basis of race under the Race Relations Act 1976. Five of their Lordships held that the school had directly discriminated against applicant pupils and two of their Lordships held that the school was indirectly discriminating on grounds of race. The case was the first adjudicated by the newly established court.

Facts

In October 2006, a Jewish father made enquiries with the United Synagogue as to whether his son, born to a mother who had been converted to Judaism under the auspices of the Masorti movement, could convert under Orthodox auspices for entry to JFS in September 2007. He was advised the process could take several years and that such applications to JFS are very rarely successful given that the school is highly oversubscribed. He applied for his son but did not declare to the school's admissions board the mother's conversion history.

By April 2007, he had not supplied JFS with the requested information, whereupon the school advised him that, being oversubscribed that year, it was unlikely his son could be offered a place. He thereupon unsuccessfully appealed for reconsideration of his application.

In July 2008, the father sought to prosecute JFS on the grounds of alleged racial discrimination, but High Court judge, Mr Justice Munby, ruled contrariwise, holding JFS' selection criteria were not intrinsically different from Christian or Islamic faith schools and their being declared illegal could adversely affect "the admission arrangements in a very large number of faith schools of many different faiths and denominations".

Judgment
Lord Phillips, Lady Hale, Lord Mance, Lord Clarke and Lord Kerr held that the school had directly discriminated on grounds of race. Lord Clarke wrote,
"I do not accept they were not considering M’s ethnic origins or making a decision on ethnic grounds....As I see it, once it is accepted...that the reason M is not a member of the Jewish religion is that his forbears in the matrilineal line were not Orthodox Jews and that, in that sense his less favourable treatment is determined by his descent, it follows that he is discriminated against on ethnic grounds....The question is, in my opinion...whether it is discrimination on ethnic grounds to discriminate against all those who are not descended from Jewish women."

Lord Hope and Lord Walker held there had been indirect discrimination on grounds of race. Lord Hope wrote that identifying the school's admission criteria as racial, rather than religious, was to confuse the effect of this unequal treatment with the grounds for the treatment; he and Lord Walker said that the school's admission policy nonetheless put certain Jews at a disadvantage.

Lord Rodger and Lord Brown dissented. Lord Rodger said that the pupil's mother "could have been as Italian in origin as Sophia Loren and as Roman Catholic as the Pope" as long as she had converted to Judaism in a manner that satisfied the school governors. Both said that the indirect discrimination found by Lords Hope and Walker was acceptable in the service of the school's objective; Lord Brown criticized the idea of imposing a test for admission based on practice and belief as closer to the Christian definition of members of a faith, when Jewish law defines membership in the religion by birth.

See also
Who is a Jew?

References

Supreme Court of the United Kingdom cases
2009 in case law
2009 in British law
Anti-discrimination law in the United Kingdom
Jewish English history
Jewish education in the United Kingdom